Three Jumps Ahead is a 1923 American silent Western film written and directed by John Ford. The film is considered to be lost.

Cast
 Tom Mix as Steve McLean
 Alma Bennett as Annie Darrell
 Edward Peil Sr. as Buck Taggitt (as Edward Piel)
 Joseph W. Girard as John Darrell (as Joe Girard)
 Virginia True Boardman as Mrs. Darrell
 Margaret Joslin as Alicia
 Francis Ford as Ben McLean
 Harry Todd as Lige McLean

See also
 Tom Mix filmography
 List of lost films

References

External links
 
 Three Jumps Ahead at SilentEra
 

1923 films
1923 Western (genre) films
1923 lost films
American black-and-white films
Films directed by John Ford
Fox Film films
Lost Western (genre) films
Lost American films
Silent American Western (genre) films
1920s American films